Kitty is a 1927 novel by the British writer Warwick Deeping. Like his earlier Sorrell and Son it was a bestseller.

Adaptation
In 1929 it was turned into a film Kitty directed by Victor Saville. Shot partly as a silent and partly with sound it was one of the earliest British talkies to be released.

References

Bibliography
 Mary Grover. The Ordeal of Warwick Deeping: Middlebrow Authorship and Cultural Embarrassment. Associated University Presse, 2009.

External links
 

1927 British novels
Novels by Warwick Deeping
British novels adapted into films
Cassell (publisher) books
Alfred A. Knopf books